All That Really Matters is a 1992 Polish drama film directed by Robert Gliński. The film was selected as the Polish entry for the Best Foreign Language Film at the 65th Academy Awards, but was not accepted as a nominee.

Cast
 Ewa Skibińska as Paulina "Ola" Wat
 Krzysztof Globisz as Aleksander Wat
 Adam Siemion as Andrzej Wat
 Grazyna Barszczewska as Barbara Zielinska
 Bogusław Linda as Tadeusz Bogucki
 Viktor Chebotaryov as Ivan
 Natalya Kolyakanova as Vera
 Krzysztof Stroiński as Adam Chrostowski

See also
 List of submissions to the 65th Academy Awards for Best Foreign Language Film
 List of Polish submissions for the Academy Award for Best Foreign Language Film

References

External links
 

1992 films
1992 drama films
Polish drama films
1990s Polish-language films
Films directed by Robert Gliński